Milton Ridbas Konvitz (March 12, 1908 – September 5, 2003) was a Cornell University faculty member. He died September 5, 2003, at the age of 95.

Early life, education and early career
He was born in 1908 in Safed, a city in what is now Israel that was then part of the vilayet of Sidon of the Ottoman Empire, and was the son of Rabbi Joseph Konvitz and grandson of Rabbi Yaakov Dovid Wilovsky (Ridvaz). In 1915, he immigrated to the United States, becoming a citizen in 1926. He studied at New York University, where he received his bachelor's degree in 1929 and in 1930 a law degree. In 1933, he received a Ph.D. in philosophy from Cornell. Prior to joining Cornell's faculty, he worked at the NAACP Legal Defense Fund, where he was one of three assistant general counsels to Thurgood Marshall.

Academic career
Konvitz was a professor in Cornell's Law School and a founding faculty member of School of Industrial and Labor Relations.   He retired in 1973.  He was an authority on constitutional and labor law, and on civil and human rights, coining the term "civil liberties." He was famous for teaching a class called American Ideals at Cornell for many years; it was based in the College of Industrial and Labor Relations and regularly drew enrollments in the many hundreds, with the eventual total exceeding over 8,000.  Young Ruth Bader, later Justice Ruth Bader Ginsburg, was one of those students.

Konvitz was one of the founders of Cornell's Department of Near Eastern Studies and of its Program of Jewish Studies.  He and his wife, the former Mary Traub, often hosted Jewish students and others.

A professorship in his name was dedicated with funds from former students and others; Ross Brann is the current Milton Konvitz Professor of Judeo-Islamic Studies.

Liberian Codification Project
Working with Chief Justice James A. A. Pierre of the Supreme Court of Liberia, Konvitz, for nearly 30 years, drew up the body of statutory laws in the Republic of Liberia. He also edited the opinions of Liberia's Supreme Court. As a token of thanks for his work he received the Grand Band of the Order of the Star of Africa, as well as an honorary degree from the University of Liberia.

Personal life
Konvitz was married for over 50 years to the former Mary Traub.  Their son Josef was a senior official of the Organisation for Economic Co-operation and Development (OECD), based in Paris, where he lives with his wife, Isa. Their sons, Eli and Ezra, live in Hong Kong and London respectively, Eli a director at  W S Atkins and Ezra having co-founded ArtStack. Josef Konvitz retired from the OECD in 2011, and was a visiting professor at King's College, London.

Published works
 A Century of Civil Rights 
 The Constitution and Civil Rights
 Fundamental Liberties of a Free People: Religion, Speech, Press, Assembly 
 The American Pragmatists : Selected Writings edited by Milton Ridvas Konvitz 
 Judaism and Human Rights
 Fundamental Rights
 Emerson: A Collection of Critical Essays
 Torah and Constitution: Essays in American Jewish Thought
 The American Pragmatists, edited by Milton R. Konvitz and Gail Kennedy
 The Alien and the Asiatic in American Law
 Expanding Liberty: Freedom's Gains in Postwar America
 Religious Liberty
 Nine American Jewish Thinkers
 Bill of Rights Reader: Leading Constitutional Cases
 Judaism and the American Idea
 Civil Rights in Immigration
 The Legacy of Horace M. Kallen
 First Amendment Freedoms: Selected Cases on Freedom of Religion, Speech, Press, Assembly
 On the Nature of Value: The Philosophy of Samuel Alexander
 Aspects of Liberty: Essays Presented to Robert E. Cushman, by Milton R. Konvitz and Clinton Rossiter
 The Recognition of Ralph Waldo Emerson
 Essays in Political Theory
 Liberian Code of Laws Revised
 Profane Religion and Sacred Law

Books and articles about
 Rights, Liberties, and Ideals: The Contributions of Milton R. Konvitz, by David Joseph Danelski
 Biography - Milton Ridvas Konvitz (1908–2003), from Contemporary Authors
 Milton R. Konvitz, z"l.: from Midstream

References

External links
 Cornell News Obituary
 Guide to the Milton R. Konvitz Papers,1942-1986 at the Kheel Center for Labor-Management Documentation and Archives, Cornell University Library

1908 births
2003 deaths
People from Safed
American people of Belarusian-Jewish descent
Cornell University faculty
Cornell University alumni
New York University School of Law alumni
20th-century American Jews
Emigrants from the Ottoman Empire to the United States